Cristo Rey is a sector in the city of Santo Domingo in the Distrito Nacional of the Dominican Republic. The neighbourhood is populated by the lower middle class. This heavily populated area was formed in the last major resettlement for industrious peasants mostly coming from the North of the country, especially around 1970–1974, when the National Zoo was built on the Arroyo Riverside.

Sources 
Distrito Nacional sectors

Populated places in Santo Domingo